Tereitaki is a settlement located towards the north end of Tabuaeran atoll, Kiribati.  Napari is the northernmost settlement; with Betania to the south.

In the 2010 census 346 people were recorded as living in Tereitaki.

References

Populated places in Kiribati